Sir Charles Cooper (1795 – 24 May 1887) was a politician and the first Chief Justice of South Australia.

Biography
Cooper was born in Henley-on-Thames, the third son of Thomas Cooper, under-sheriff of Oxfordshire. Charles entered the Inner Temple in 1822 and was called to the bar in February 1827. He practised on the Oxford circuit until 1838, and was then appointed judge at Adelaide. He and his sister Sarah Ann Cooper landed there in March 1839 in the Katherine Stewart Forbes, and was for many years the sole judge, then senior judge, and in June 1856 was appointed the first South Australian chief justice. In September 1860 he was sworn in as a member of the Executive Council.

Cooper retired from the bench in November 1861 and from the Executive Council in August 1862 owing to ill-health and was given a pension of £1000 a year. He returned to England in 1862, resided at Bath, Somerset, and improving much in his health lived to be 92 years of age. He died at London on 24 May 1887. He married in 1853 Emily Grace Newenham, daughter of Charles Burton Newenham (Sheriff of South Australia 1839-1856). He was knighted in 1857. Cooper's Creek, (now Cooper Creek), in central Australia was named after him by his friend, Captain Sturt. Cooper was a thoroughly capable judge who earned the esteem of the colonists. He held courts at first in his own house, which had the advantage that he was constantly on the premises. He was a sound lawyer and framed the first insolvency legislation of the colony. Though not robust looking, he was hospitable and interested in the social and intellectual life of the colony.

While in South Australia he had a seaside residence adjacent "The Grange", Charles Sturt's property for which Grange Beach was named. It is likely that Henley Beach was named for Cooper's hometown after Cooper rejected Sturt's proposed name "Cooper's Beach".
His city home, at south-east corner of Whitmore Square, was in May 1870 re-opened as the Bushmen's Club, a facility for members visiting the city.

Family
On 7 July 1853, Charles Cooper married Emily Grace Newenham, eldest daughter of Charles Burton Newenham, Sheriff of the Province. They had no children, and she outlived him.

His sister Sarah Ann Cooper (c. 1804 – 31 May 1895) married William Bartley (1801–1885), Senior Solicitor to the Lands Titles Office on 23 September 1852.

Sources

'Cooper, Sir Charles (1795 - 1887)', Australian Dictionary of Biography, Volume 1, MUP, 1966, pp 244–245.

References

External links
 

1795 births
1887 deaths
Chief Justices of South Australia
Judges of the Supreme Court of South Australia
Colony of South Australia judges
19th-century Australian judges
South Australian politicians
People from Henley-on-Thames

19th-century Australian politicians